Larger Than Life is a 2008 album by German metal band Paragon.

A supportive "teaser" EP for the band's 2008 album Screenslaves. Including a cover of the boyband Backstreet Boys' song "Larger Than Life" and Slayer's "Die By The Sword". Plus some older songs live and the title track for their above-mentioned album. A video for "Larger Than Life" is also included.

Songs 
"Larger Than Life" (Backstreet Boys-cover)
"Die By The Sword" (Slayer-cover)
"Screenslaves"
"Dragon's Flight" (live)
"Legions Of Metal" (live)

Line-up 
Andreas Babuschkin  -  Vocals
Martin Christian    -  Guitars
Günny Kruse         -  Guitars
Dirk Seifert        -  Bass
Christian Gripp     -  Drums

2008 EPs